Fatal Deception: Mrs. Lee Harvey Oswald is a 1993 American biographical drama television film directed by Robert Dornhelm and starring Helena Bonham Carter, Robert Picardo, and Frank Whaley. It tells the story of Marina Oswald (played by Bonham Carter), the widow of Kennedy's assassin Lee Harvey Oswald (played by Whaley).

The film marked the 30th anniversary of the assassination of John F. Kennedy, which occurred on November 22, 1963. Bonham Carter earned her first Golden Globe Award nomination for her performance. Whaley had previously played an imposter of Lee Harvey Oswald in Oliver Stone's JFK (1991).

Plot
The story focuses on Marina Oswald (Helena Bonham Carter), the wife of Lee Harvey Oswald. Barely able to speak English, she is thrust into questioning by David Lifton (Robert Picardo). It portrays deep sadness, and explores the story of a woman ending up alone in a foreign country, subjected to considerable shunning, even after her remarriage.

The story is based on the widow of Lee Harvey Oswald, the assassin of President Kennedy. Via flashbacks, the story traces the woman's life from her days in the Soviet Union, the turmoil following the assassination, raising her family, and coming to grips with the fact that, she too, may have been a pawn in a grand conspiracy.

Cast
 Helena Bonham Carter as Marina Oswald
 Robert Picardo as David Lifton
 Frank Whaley as Lee Harvey Oswald
 Bill Bolender as George de Mohrenschildt
 Brandon Smith as Kenneth Porter
 Lisa Renee Wilson as Rachel Porter
 Deborah Dawn Slaboda as Julie Porter
 Ingeborga Dapkūnaitė as Lubya
 Vladimir Ilyin as Uncle
 Quenby Bakke as Janet Williams
 Norman Bennett as Funeral Director
 Rodger Boyce as 2nd Agent
 Cliff Stephens as 1st Agent
 Alan Ackles as TV Host
 Randall Bonifay as 2nd FBI Guard
 Darryl Cox as 1st FBI Guard

Reviews
In a review for the Los Angeles Times, Howard Rosenberg wrote: "“Fatal Deception” appears to say nothing that hasn’t already been said ad infinitum during the nation’s nonstop dialogue concerning Kennedy and his assassination. All in all, it seems like just another bump on a very long log." Drew Voros of Variety called it "a slow-mover for a topic that has been covered over and over again".

Awards and nominations

References

External links
 

1993 films
1993 drama films
1993 television films
1990s biographical drama films
American biographical drama films
Biographical television films
American drama television films
Films about the assassination of John F. Kennedy
Films directed by Robert Dornhelm
Films scored by Harald Kloser
Films shot in Dallas
Films shot in Moscow
NBC network original films
The Wolper Organization films
Warner Bros. films
Cultural depictions of Lee Harvey Oswald
1990s English-language films
1990s American films